In mathematics, in particular in the theory of modular forms, a Hecke operator, studied by , is a certain kind of "averaging" operator that plays a significant role in the structure of vector spaces of modular forms and more general automorphic representations.

History 

Mordell proved that the Ramanujan tau function, expressing the coefficients of the Ramanujan form,

 

is a multiplicative function:

 

The idea  goes back to earlier work of Adolf Hurwitz, who treated algebraic correspondences between modular curves which realise some individual Hecke operators.

Mathematical description 

Hecke operators can be realized in a number of contexts. The simplest meaning is combinatorial, namely as taking for a given integer  some function  defined on the lattices of fixed rank to

Modular forms are particular kinds of functions of a lattice, subject to conditions making them analytic functions and homogeneous with respect to homotheties, as well as moderate growth at infinity; these conditions are preserved by the summation, and so Hecke operators preserve the space of modular forms of a given weight.

Another way to express Hecke operators is by means of double cosets in the modular group. In the contemporary adelic approach, this translates to double cosets with respect to some compact subgroups.

Explicit formula 

Let  be the set of  integral matrices with determinant  and  be the full modular group . Given a modular form  of weight , the th Hecke operator acts by the formula

 

where  is in the upper half-plane and the normalization constant  assures that the image of a form with integer Fourier coefficients has integer Fourier coefficients. This can be rewritten in the form

 

 

One can see from this explicit formula that Hecke operators with different indices commute and that if  then , so the subspace  of cusp forms of weight  is preserved by the Hecke operators. Hecke eigenforms are normalized so that , then

 

Thus for normalized cuspidal Hecke eigenforms of integer weight, their Fourier coefficients coincide with their Hecke eigenvalues.

Hecke algebras 

Algebras of Hecke operators are called "Hecke algebras", and are commutative rings. In the classical elliptic modular form theory,  the Hecke operators  with  coprime to the level acting on the space of cusp forms of a given weight are self-adjoint with respect to the Petersson inner product. Therefore, the spectral theorem implies that there is a basis of modular forms that are eigenfunctions for these Hecke operators. Each of these basic forms possesses an Euler product. In the case treated by Mordell, the space of cusp forms of weight 12 with respect to the full modular group is one-dimensional.

Other related mathematical rings are also called "Hecke algebras", although sometimes the link to Hecke operators is not entirely obvious. These algebras include certain quotients of the group algebras of braid groups. The presence of this commutative operator algebra plays a significant role in the harmonic analysis of modular forms and generalisations.

See also 

 Eichler–Shimura congruence relation
 Hecke algebra
 Abstract algebra
 Wiles's proof of Fermat's Last Theorem

References 

  (See chapter 8.)

 

 Jean-Pierre Serre, A course in arithmetic.
 Don Zagier, Elliptic Modular Forms and Their Applications, in The 1-2-3 of Modular Forms, Universitext, Springer, 2008 

Modular forms